One Sunday Afternoon is a 1948 musical film directed by Raoul Walsh, starring Dennis Morgan and Janis Paige.

The film is based on James Hagan's play of the same name, which was produced on Broadway in 1933. This picture was the play's third film adaptation. The first, 1933 adaptation starred Gary Cooper. The second was The Strawberry Blonde (1941) starring James Cagney, Olivia de Havilland and Rita Hayworth, and also directed by Walsh. While the plot of the third adaptation is the same as the others, it does have a significant number of changes.

Cast 
 Dennis Morgan as Timothy L. "Biff" Grimes 
 Janis Paige as Virginia Brush
 Don DeFore as Hugo Barnstead
 Dorothy Malone as Amy Lind 
 Ben Blue as Nick
 Oscar O'Shea as Toby
 Alan Hale, Jr. as Marty
 Chester Conklin as Clerk (uncredited)

Cast notes
Dorothy Malones' singing voice was provided by Marion Morgan.

Production 
This film is a musical remake of The Strawberry Blonde (1941), with some updates like an automobile for the first date instead of a horse and carriage. The tunes include "In My Merry Oldsmobile". Dennis Morgan stars in the leading role James Cagney had played in the earlier version, with Don DeFore in the role of the pseudo friend previously played by Jack Carson.

Radio adaptation
One Sunday Afternoon was presented on Philip Morris Playhouse February 24, 1952. The 30-minute adaptation starred Hume Cronyn and Southern Methodist University student Ann Wedgeworth.

References

External links 
 
 
 
 

1948 films
1948 musical comedy films
1948 romantic comedy films
Remakes of American films
American musical comedy films
American romantic comedy films
1940s English-language films
American films based on plays
Films directed by Raoul Walsh
Films set in the 1890s
Warner Bros. films
1940s American films